Der Roiter Emes ('The Red Truth') was a Yiddish-language newspaper published from Riga, Latvia. The first issue was published on January 13, 1919. It was an organ of the Communist Party of Latvia. It was published three times per week. The newspaper featured frequent attacks on the bourgeoisie and the Jewish religious establishment. It ceased publication when the Bolshevik forces lost control of Riga on May 22, 1919.

References

Anti-Orthodox Judaism sentiment
Jews and Judaism in Riga
Newspapers established in 1919
Publications disestablished in 1919
Yiddish communist newspapers
Mass media in Riga
Newspapers published in Latvia
Secular Jewish culture in Europe
Yiddish culture in Latvia
1919 establishments in Latvia